HMS Colchester was a 50-gun fourth rate ship of the line of the English Royal Navy, launched at Blackwall Yard in 1694. She foundered at Whitesand Bay, Sennen Cove on 16 January 1704 with the loss of approximately one hundred lives.

Notes

References

Lavery, Brian (2003) The Ship of the Line - Volume 1: The development of the battlefleet 1650-1850. Conway Maritime Press. .

Ships of the line of the Royal Navy
1690s ships
Ships built by the Blackwall Yard